A Man Called Shenandoah is an American western series that aired Monday evenings on ABC-TV from September 13, 1965 to May 16, 1966. It was produced by MGM Television. Some of the location work for the 34 half-hour black and white episodes were filmed in California's Sierra Nevada and Mojave Desert.

The series starred Robert Horton, who had costarred on Wagon Train from 1957 to 1962. He left that series, vowing never to do another television western, but agreed to star in A Man Called Shenandoah because he felt the show would be a great opportunity for him as an actor. The series is set in 1870 and portrays an amnesiac facing hardship and danger while trying to unravel his identity and his past.

Overview
Robert Horton plays a man who was shot and left for dead. In the premiere episode, two buffalo hunters find him out on the prairie and, thinking he might be an outlaw, take him to the nearest town in hopes of receiving reward money.  When he regains consciousness, he has no recollection of who he was, or why anyone would want to harm him. The doctor who treats his wounds gives him the name "Shenandoah," stating the word means "land of silence".

For the remainder of the series, Shenandoah roams the West in search of clues to his identity. He learns that he had been a Union officer during the American Civil War, and comes to believe that he had been married. The final episode, "Macauley's Cure", ends with Mrs. Macauley telling Shenandoah: "It's not always important who you are; it's always important what you are."

Among the guest stars on the series were Claude Akins, Ed Asner, Elisha Cook Jr., Jeanne Cooper, John Dehner, Bruce Dern, Elinor Donahue, Leif Erickson, Beverly Garland, Sally Kellerman, DeForest Kelley, George Kennedy, Martin Landau, Cloris Leachman, John McIntire, Martin Milner, Leonard Nimoy, Jeanette Nolan, Warren Oates, Susan Oliver, Joyce Van Patten, James Doohan, and Michael Witney.

Theme song
The show's theme song was the traditional American folk tune "Oh Shenandoah", with new, specialized lyrics written by Horton himself. Horton, who had performed in musical theater, also sang the song. His recording became a Columbia single in 1965. It is from Horton's Columbia album The Man Called Shenandoah (Cs-9208, stereo; Cl-2408, mono; both 1965).

The series is popular on Rhodesian Television (RTV) in central Africa, and the song, reworked by local talent Nick Taylor, reached Number 3 on the Rhodesian Broadcasting Corporation hit parade.

Broadcast
When reruns of the series aired on Turner Network Television in the 1990s, only 29 of the 34 episodes were rebroadcast. Since 2017, A Man Called Shenandoah has aired in the United States on the GetTV network, as part of their Western-themed programming block.

In February 2014, Warner Archive Instant offered all 34 uncut episodes as part of their streaming service.

Episodes

Home media
On May 8, 2018, Warner Bros. released A Man Called Shenandoah – The Complete Series on DVD via their Warner Archive Collection.  This is a manufacture-on-demand (MOD) release, available through Warner's online store and Amazon.com.

Reception

As Boyd Magers noted, "stiff timeslot competition doomed Shenandoah after 34 half-hour episodes... and the series was cancelled on May 16, 1966, after 34 episodes, offering no resolution to Shenandoah’s search for truth."

References

External links

Shenandoah Episode Guide

1965 American television series debuts
1966 American television series endings
Fiction set in 1870
Television series set in the 1870s
1960s Western (genre) television series
American Broadcasting Company original programming
Television series by Warner Bros. Television Studios
Black-and-white American television shows
English-language television shows
Television series by MGM Television
Television shows filmed in California
Fiction about amnesia